Apradhi may refer to:

Aparadhi (1949 film), a Bollywood film by Yeshwant Pethkar starring Madhubala
Apradhi (1974 film), a Bollywood drama by Jugal Kishore starring Yogeeta Bali and Master Bhagwan
Apradhi (1992 film), a Bollywood film by K. Ravi Shankar

See also
 Aparadhi (disambiguation)
Apradh